Raimund Hoghe (12 May 1949 – 14 May 2021) was a German choreographer, dancer, film maker, journalist, and author. Because he was born with scoliosis, his early efforts were focused on journalism. His writings explored the human condition; a documentation series won him an award by the age of 24. For the weekly Die Zeit, he portrayed personalities, the well-to-do, the less fortunate, and those shunned by society. After meeting Pina Bausch while profiling her, he served as dramaturge and chronicler of her Tanztheater from 1980 to 1990. He made his choreographic debut in 1989, then worked independently. His first solo production, Meinwärts in 1994, was about the Jewish tenor and actor Josef Schmidt, but also Hoghe's nonormative body. He was awarded the Deutscher Tanzpreis in 2020, and is regarded as "one of the protagonists of German contemporary dance theatre".

Life 
Hoghe was born and raised in Wuppertal, the son of a single mother. He was born with severe scoliosis. He dreamed of performing in theatre, but thought that performing would not be possible for him because of his physical limitations. He worked as a journalist, and was awarded the Theodor Wolff Prize for a documentary series about Bethel written when he was age 24. His profiles were also published in several books.

When Hoghe profiled Pina Bausch in the late 1970s, she liked his article and engaged him to write program notes for a production of her dance company in Wuppertal, later called Tanztheater Wuppertal. From 1980 to 1990, Hoghe was dramaturge for the company, writing also two books about it. During his time with Bausch at Wuppertal, he collaborated on a number of pieces, including  "1980," "Ahnen" and "Bandoneon." Beginning in 1989, he developed his own productions there, with dancers and actors. From 1992, he collaborated with the artist and scenic designer Luca Giacomo Schulte. He produced his first solo, Meinwärts, in 1994, followed by Chambre séparée in 1997 and Another Dream in 2000, as a trilogy about the 20th century. His works dealt with political circumstances, such as the situation of refugees in Europe, and, in the 1990s, the beginning of the AIDS crisis which was a topic in Meinwärts.

Hoghe directed several films, also for television, like his self-portrait Der Buckel (The Hunchback) for the WDR in 1997. His books were translated into several languages. His productions were presented in France, Germany, Norway, Portugal, United Kingdom and U.S., among others.  He received awards including the Deutscher Produzentenpreis für Choreografie in 2001 and the Prix de la critique Francaise for Swan Lake, 4 Acts in the category "Best foreign production" in 2006. In 2008, Hoghe was named Dancer of the Year by the reviewers of the Tanz magazine. In 2019 he became an officer of the Ordre des Arts et des Lettres. He received the Deutscher Tanzpreis award in 2020.

Hoghe lived in Düsseldorf, where he died on 14 May 2021, at the age of 72.

Publications 
Hoghe's publications include:
 Wenn keiner singt, ist es still. Porträts, Rezensionen und andere Texte. Verlag Theater der Zeit, Berlin 2019, ISBN 978-3-95749-233-3
 Raimund Hoghe. Verlag Theater der Zeit, Berlin, 2013, 
 Pina Bausch. Sangensha Publishing, Tokyo, 1999
 Zeitporträts. Beltz Quadriga Verlag, Weinheim/Berlin 1993, 
 Pina Bausch – Historias de teatro danza por Raimund Hoghe. Ultramar Editores, Barcelona 1989
 Bandoneon – Em que o tango pode ser bom para tudo? Attar Editorial, São Paulo 1989
 Pina Bausch – Histoires de théâtre dansé. L’Arche Éditeur, Paris 1987
 Pina Bausch – Tanztheatergeschichten. Mit Fotos von Ulli Weiss. Suhrkamp Verlag, Frankfurt am Main 1987, 
 Wo es nichts zu weinen gibt. Porträts und Reportagen. Van Acken Verlag, Krefeld 1987/90, 
 Preis der Liebe. Rimbaud Presse, Aachen 1984, 
 Anderssein. Lebensläufe außerhalb der Norm. Sammlung Luchterhand, Darmstadt 1982, 
 Bandoneon – Für was kann Tango alles gut sein? Texte und Fotos zu einem Stück von Pina Bausch. Luchterhand Verlag, Darmstadt 1981/2013, 
 Schwäche als Stärke. Bethel – Ein Symbol und die Realität. Neukirchener Verlag, Neukirchen-Vluyn 1976,

Productions 
Hoghe's productions include:

 1989: Forbidden Fruit
 1990: Vento
 1992: Verdi Prati
 1994: Meinwärts
 1995: Geraldo's Solo
 1997: Chambre séparée
 1998: Dialogue with Charlotte
 1999: Lettere amorose
 2000: Another Dream

 2002: Sarah, Vincent et moi
 2002: Young People, Old Voices
 2003: Tanzgeschichten
 2004: Sacre – The Rite of Spring
 2005: Swan Lake, 4 Acts
 2007: 36, Avenue Georges Mandel
 2007: Bolero Variationen
 2008: L’Après-midi
 2009: Body/Space/Music
 2009: Sans-titre
 2010: Si je meurs laissez le balcon ouvert
 2011: Pas de Deux
 2012: Cantatas
 2013: An Evening with Judy
 2014: Quartet
 2015: Songs for Takashi
 2016: Musiques et mots pour Emmanuel
 2016: La Valse
 2017: Lettere amorose, 1999–2017

 2018: Canzone per Ornella

 2019/20 Postcards from Vietnam

Films 
 Die Jugend ist im Kopf / La jeunesse est dans la tête, portrait of Marie-Thérèse Allier, director of the Menagérie de Verre in Paris. Director: Hoghe, production: Arte 2018.
 Cartes Postales, dance film, France 2005, director: Richard Copans, production: Les Films d'Ici, Arte France, first aired on 30 October 2005
 Young People, Old Voices. France, 2005, production: Centre Pompidou Paris.

 Es bleibt noch viel zu sagen, television documentary, Germany, 1980

Film portraits 
 Raimund Hoghe, der Außergewöhnliche. Germany, 2012, 43 min., moderation: , production: arte, redaction: , first aired: 11 November 2012

 Der Buckel. self-portrait, 1997, WDR

Awards 
 1974: Theodor-Wolff-Preis
 1982: Förderpreis für Literatur der Landeshauptstadt Düsseldorf
 1983: 
 2001: Deutscher Produzentenpreis für Choreographie
 2006: Prix de la critique Francaise (Meilleur spectacle étranger)
 2008: Dancer of the Year of the  magazine
 2019: Ordre des Arts et des Lettres
 2020: Deutscher Tanzpreis

References

Further reading 
 Raimund Hoghe. ed. by Kunststiftung NRW, Theater der Zeit, Berlin 2013, .
 Mary Kate Connolly (ed.): Throwing the Body into the Fight, Intellect books & Live Art Development Agency, London / UK, 2013. 
 Katja Schneider, Thomas Betz (eds.): Schreiben mit Körpern: Der Choreograph Raimund Hoghe. (in German) K. Kieser, Munich, 2012, .
 Jeroen Peeters, Martin Hargreaves, Gerald Siegmund: Shadow Bodies. On Philipp Gehmacher and Raimund Hoghe. Cultureel Centrum Maasmechelen, Belgium, 2006. abstract dansinlimburg.be
 Helmut Ploebst: no wind no word. Neue Choreographie in der Gesellschaft des Spektakels. (New choreography in the society of the spectacle.) 9 Porträts: Meg Stuart, Vera Mantero, Xavier Le Roy, Benoît Lachambre, Raimund Hoghe, Emio Greco/PC, Joao Fiadeiro, Boris Charmatz, Jérôme Bel. K. Kieser Verlag, Munich, 2001, . contents digitool.hbz-nrw.de
 Marie-Florence Ehret: Raimund Hoghe. L’ange inachevé. Fiction. Éditions Comp'Act & Centre international de Bagnolet pour les oeuvres choréographiques Seine-Saint-Denis, France, 2001, . (in French, bibliography, filmography)

External links 
 
 

 
 Dramaturg Raimund Hoghe zu Pina Bausch (video) 3sat 8 July 2009

20th-century German dancers
Ballet choreographers
German choreographers
Dramaturges
German journalists
Officiers of the Ordre des Arts et des Lettres

Mass media people from Wuppertal
1949 births
2021 deaths
Mass media people from Düsseldorf